Catherine Helen Spence Memorial Scholarships are travelling scholarships founded by the South Australian Government in 1911 in recognition of the pioneering social worker and feminist Catherine Helen Spence.

The scholarships are administered by the Catherine Helen Spence Memorial Scholarship Committee, and granted to selected applicants, who must be female and between the ages of 20 and 46. Membership of the scholarship committee is voluntary and appointed  by the Minister of Education and Child Development on recommendation by the committee. 

Previous recipients were:

1912 Dorothea Proud

1921 Constance Davey (1882–1963), psychologist.  To undertake a doctorate at the University of London; her main area of research was 'mental efficiency and deficiency' in children. 

1925 Daisy Curtis, female police officer.  To examine the 'methods of protecting women and children'.  This included travels to the jurisdictions of Great Britain, Norway, Sweden, Germany, Nederlands, the United States of America, and New Zealand.  (New Zealand did not get it first female officer until 1941.)

1929 G. Vera Gaetjens

1933 Agnes Dorsch

1938 Doris Beeston

1946 Mary Smith (1909–1989).  To study 'modern trends in child psychology and work with adolescents', travelling to the Victoria University of Manchester, England.

1953 Diana Lorking

1962 Marie Mune

1971 Fay Gale (1932–2008), cultural geographer.  Enabled to be a visiting lecturer in the Geography School at Oxford University, England.  

1976 Alwyn Dolling

1983 Anne Killen

1989 Fran Baum, social scientist.  Investigatated healthy cities in Europe and Canada.

1993 Ronda Schultz

1997 Megan Warin

2001 Janette Young

2005 Melanie Jones (SA police)

2009 Sarah Paddick

2013 Joanne Kaeding

2018 Dr Prudence Flowers

References

External links 
 SA Government list of recipients

South Australia-related lists
Lists of Australian women
Lists of Australian people
Scholarships in Australia